Douglas Crase (born 1944) is an American poet, essayist and critic. He was born in 1944 in Battle Creek, Michigan. His poetry collection, The Revisionist, was nominated for a National Book Critics Circle Award and an American Book Award. He is a former MacArthur Fellow and the recipient of a Whiting Award. Crase lives in New York City and Honesdale, Pennsylvania. His work has been published in many collections, including his poem "Astropastoral", found in The KGB Bar Book Of Poems edited by David Lehman and Star Black.

Selected works 
The Revisionist, The Astropastorals published by Pressed Wafer, Lines from London Terrace, Essays and Addresses, The Revisionist and the Astropastorals  published by Nightboat Books, AMERIFIL.TXT: A Commonplace Book (Poets On Poetry) and Ralph Waldo Emerson: Essays: The First and Second Series Format

References

External links
Profile at The Whiting Foundation
Douglas Crase and Frank Polach Papers. General Collection, Beinecke Rare Book and Manuscript Library, Yale University.

American male poets
American essayists
American literary critics
1944 births
Living people
MacArthur Fellows
American male essayists
20th-century American poets
20th-century American male writers